is a Japanese IT enterprise management consultant, and one of the most well-known commentators on IT and Web 2.0 issues in Japan. He is the author of a best-seller book "Web Shinkaron (Theory of Web Evolution)". He is the president and founder of the Silicon Valley-based MUSE Associates, holds a Bachelor of Electrical Engineering from Keio University and a Master of Information Science from Tokyo University, and is a board member of Ricoh.

Early life

Mochio Umeda was born in Tokyo, Japan, on 30 August, the son of playwright Haruo Umeda. He attended Keio Youchisha primary school, and then went on to Keio junior, senior highschool, from 1973 to 1979. He studied at Keio University, Tokyo, from 1979 to 1983, where he studied Engineering. He then went on to study at Tokyo University, where he received a Master of Information Science.

Career

Upon his graduation, he joined Arthur D. Little, an international management consulting firm and served as a strategist for Japanese IT companies.

In 1994, he moved to Silicon Valley as one of the  Founding Directors of the Arthur D. Little Silicon Valley office.

In 1997, he left the firm and founded MUSE Associates, a strategic consulting company catering high-tech businesses for both Japanese and Silicon Valley companies, in Palo Alto, Ca.

In 2000, he established Pacifica Fund, a Silicon Valley venture fund specializing in early investments in select, emerging information technology, energy, and materials companies.
 
During 2001-2005, he served as a member of Management Advisory Board at NEC.

During 2001-2003, he served as a member of Advisory Board at NTT Docomo.

During 2002-2004, he served as a member of Advisory Board at Omron.

In 2005, he joined the Board of Hatena. (Resigned in 2011)

In 2010, he joined the Board of Ricoh.

Writings

Web Shinkaron (Theory of Web Evolution), Web Jidai wo Yuku (The Web and the Rest of Us), Web Jidai no Itsutsu no Teiri (5 Principles in the Web Era)

In 2006, he wrote "Web Shinkaron", in which he elucidated the rapid changes then happening in the IT industry, mainly from Silicon Valley. The book became a best-seller, appealing to both experts and laypeople of the industry with clear and well-structured explanations, and he successively went on to write "Web Jidai wo Yuku (2007)" and "Web Jidai Itsutsu no Teiri (2008)". The trilogy sold more than 800,000 copies in total, and his voice and insights regarding the IT industry are still most valued in Japan.

Yoshiharu Habu and Modern Shogi translation project 

When he published his 7th book, "シリコンバレーから将棋を観る 羽生善治と現代 'Yoshiharu Habu and Modern Shogi'", Umeda announced in his blog that he would allow anyone to translate it into any language without permission from him or the publisher (20 April 2009). Four days after the publication of the book on April 25, a Japanese college student announced on his blog that he had started a project to translate the book into English, which immediately attracted many collaborators. A French version of the project also started around the same time.

Within a week since its inception, the first draft of the English project was finished and made public, making it possible for anyone to participate and make corrections regarding English, whose quality was not perfect since no professional translator was a member of the initial group of this project. The leader of the project emphasizes the characteristics of the project as open-source, asking for unexpected contributions from unexpected places (e.g. A non-Japanese shogi lover might make a film explaining some difficult shogi moves in the book and post it on YouTube, or she might want to create a computer shogi which is stronger at shogi than human.) In this regard, it is possible to say that this project not only helps spread shogi, which is one of the most prominent Japanese traditional cultures, to the world but also contributes to introducing open-source-mindedness to the Japanese web.

Works

References

External links 
Official Site
Personal blog "My Life Between Silicon Valley and Japan"
Profile at MUSE Associates

People in information technology
1960 births
Japanese bloggers
Japanese businesspeople
Keio University alumni
Living people